Sebastian James Harris (born August 5, 1987) is a retired American soccer player who most recently played for Detroit City FC in the National Premier Soccer League.

Career

College and amateur
Born in Rochester, Michigan, Harris attended Lake Orion High School in Lake Orion, Michigan, and played college soccer at Oakland University, and impressed scoring 12 goals, including 9 assists in 45 games over a three-year period. He also played with the Michigan Bucks in the USL Premier Development League in 2009, making 14 appearances for the team.

Professional
Following the conclusion of the 2009 PDL season, Harris travelled to England, and was offered a trial with English League Two side Northampton Town. After scoring two goals in friendlies against Long Buckby and Stamford, Harris joined Northampton on August 3, 2009, on a six month contract. Harris made his professional debut on November 21, against Crewe Alexandra, coming on as a substitute in the 2–2 draw. Harris was retained at the end of January until the end of the season, and repaid Ian Sampson's faith in him with a late winner against Cheltenham Town on February 27. Harris signed a new contract at the end of the season and was converted by Sampson into a defender for the 2010–11 season.

On October 29, 2010 he joined Stafford Rangers on loan until January 2011. After his loan at Stafford expired, he moved to Nuneaton Town on a one-month loan., before being released by Northampton at the end of the season.

Returning to the United States, Harris joined his old club Michigan Bucks in the USL Premier Development League for the 2011 season. He played his first game back with the Bucks on June 10, a 2–1 win over Forest City London. 

In 2014, Harris joined Detroit City FC, making 17 appearances between 2014 and 2015 as a defender. After the 2015 season, a supporter podcast for the club named him Detroit City FC's "Breakout Player of the Year."

References

External links
Oakland University profile
Sebastian Harris player profile at ntfc.co.uk

1987 births
Living people
Oakland University alumni
American soccer players
American expatriate sportspeople in England
Soccer players from Michigan
Flint City Bucks players
Northampton Town F.C. players
Stafford Rangers F.C. players
English Football League players
USL League Two players
National Premier Soccer League players
Oakland Golden Grizzlies men's soccer players
People from Rochester, Michigan
Association football defenders
Association football forwards
Expatriate footballers in England